Pique is an 1875 play produced by Augustin Daly, which had a very successful run of 237 consecutive performances in New York at the Fifth Avenue Theatre."Pique" at the Fifth Avenue Theatre, The Aldine (Vol. 8, No. 1) (1876)  

It was based in part on the Florence Marryat novel Her Lord and Master.(26 Feb. 1876). "Pique" at the Fifth Avenue Theatre, The New York Times  It debuted on December 14, 1875, and was withdrawn after Saturday, July 29, 1876.   It ran in at least two versions in London and also was produced on tour.Miller, Tice L. Entertaining the Nation: American Drama in the Eighteenth and Nineteenth Centuries, p. 117 (2007).

The original cast included Maurice Barrymore, where he met his future wife Georgiana Drew.

Though the play was a success, critical response varied from "highly laudatory puff pieces to accusations of excessive sentiment and irritating sensationalism."

Original Broadway cast
 Charles Fisher as Matthew Standish
 D. H. Harkins as Arthur Standish
 Maurice Barrymore as Raymong Lessing
 Frank Hardenbergh as Rga-Monney Jim
 Belle Wharton as Little Arthur
 Fanny Davenport as Mabel Renfrew
 Mrs. G.H. Gilbert as Aunt Dorothy
 Kate Holland as Mother Thames
 Lizzie Griffiths as Sylvie
 John Brougham as Dr. Gossitt
 Jason Lewis as Sammy Dymple
 John Drew, Jr. as Thorsby Gyll
 C.H. Rockwell as Picker Bob
 William Pleater Davidge as Pedder
 W. Beekman as Rattlin
 J. Deaveau as Captain Spears
 Emily Rigl as Lucille Renfrew
 Jeffreys Lewis as Mary Standish (replaced by Georgiana Drew in April 1876)
 Sydney Cowell (daughter of Sam Cowell) as Raitch

References

External links
 

1875 plays